Herpetopoma annectans is a species of sea snail, a marine gastropod mollusk in the family Chilodontidae.

Description
The height of the shell attains 5 mm.

Distribution
This marine species occurs off Western Australia and South Australia.

References

External links
 To World Register of Marine Species

annectans
Gastropods described in 1893